A Yule log or bûche de Noël is a traditional Christmas cake, often served as a dessert near Christmas, especially in France, Belgium, Luxembourg, Switzerland, Vietnam, and Quebec, Canada.

Variants are also served in the United States, United Kingdom, Scandinavia, Portugal, and Spain. 

Made of sponge cake, to resemble a miniature actual Yule log, it is a form of sweet roulade.

The cake emerged in the 19th century, probably in France, before spreading to other countries. It is traditionally made from a genoise, generally baked in a large, shallow Swiss roll pan, iced, rolled to form a cylinder, and iced again on the outside. The most common combination is basic yellow sponge cake and chocolate buttercream, though many variations that include chocolate cake, ganache, and icings flavored with espresso or liqueurs exist.

Yule logs are often served with one end cut off and set atop the cake, or protruding from its side to resemble a chopped off branch. A bark-like texture is often produced by dragging a fork through the icing, and powdered sugar sprinkled to resemble snow. Other cake decorations may include actual tree branches, fresh berries, and mushrooms made of meringue or marzipan.

The name bûche de Noël originally referred to the Yule log itself, and was transferred to the dessert after the custom had fallen out of popular use. References to it as bûche de Noël or, in English, Yule Log, can be found from at least the Edwardian era (for example, F. Vine, Saleable Shop Goods (1898 and later).

Gallery

See also

 Christmas cake
 List of desserts
 Nut roll
 Pionono
 Swiss roll

References

Citations

General references
 "la Bûche de Noël" in: Le Calendrier Traditionnel, Voici: la France de ce mois, vol. 2, no. 17–21, Voici Press (1941).
 Albert Goursaud, Maurice Robert, La société rurale traditionnelle en Limousin: ethnographie, pp. 471, 474
 Claude Seignolle, Traditions populaires de Provence, pp. 84-87
 Arnold van Gennep, Manuel de folklore français contemporain, pt. 2, Du berceau à la tombe (1946)

External links

 Buche de Noel (via foodtimeline.org)
 

Belgian cuisine
Chocolate desserts
Christmas in Canada
French cakes
Chocolate-covered foods
Sponge cakes
Swiss cuisine
Culinary Heritage of Switzerland
Yule
Christmas cakes
World cuisine